The 1st Antalya Golden Orange Film Festival was held from October 4 to 10, 1964 in Antalya, Turkey. It was initiated by Dr. Avni Tolunay, who had been patronising summer concerts and plays at the historical Aspendos Theatre since the mid-1950s and had become the mayor of Antalya the previous year. He also chose the orange as the symbol of the festival. The festival, which had the stated aim "to support the sector of Turkish cinema in material and moral terms, to pave the way for Turkish cinema to be opened to the international platform by encouraging Turkish film producers to produce qualified productions," was held under what the official website describes as "difficult conditions" but generated "a great interest" nonetheless. Golden Oranges were awarded in seven categories to the six Turkish films made in the preceding year which were selected to compete in the festival's National Feature Film Competition.

National Feature Film Competition

Golden Orange Awards 
The National Feature Film Competition Jury, headed by Dr. Avni Tolunay, awarded Golden Oranges in seven categories.
Best Film: Birds of Exile directed by Halit Refiğ
Best Director: Halit Refiğ for Birds of Exile
Best Cinematography: Ali Uğur for Bitter Life
Best Actress: Türkan Şoray for Bitter Life
Best Actor: İzzet Günay for Trees Die Standing
Best Supporting Actress: Yıldız Kenter for Trees Die Standing
Best Supporting Actor: Ulvi Uraz for Tomorrow Is for You

Official Selection 
Six Turkish films made in the preceding year were selected to compete in the festival's National Feature Film Competition.
 Birds of Exile directed by Halit Refiğ
 Bitter Life directed by Metin Erksan
 Tomorrow Is for You directed by Atıf Yılmaz
  Trees Die Standing directed by Memduh Ün
 The Angry Young Man directed by Ertem Göreç
 Ayrılan Yollar directed by Ertem Göreç

See also 
 1964 in film

External links

 for the festival

References

Antalya Golden Orange Film Festival
Antalya Golden Orange Film Festival
Antalya Golden Orange Film Festival